Two for the Road is a live album by American jazz fusion guitarists Larry Coryell and Steve Khan that which was released by Arista Records in 1977.

Reception
AllMusic awarded the album 4 stars and its review by Eugene Chadbourne states: "Intermittently on the road as an acoustic duo between gaps in the schedules of their respective ultra-hip fusion bands, Larry Coryell and Steve Khan managed to record several shows and then panned the tape stream to find the nuggets for posterity. There are choices that might have been made out of the fashions of the day, such as the version of Chick Corea's "Spain" that opens the album's first side. Thankfully there are also selections that are here because both guitarists must have realized they were playing magnificently".

Track listing

Personnel
 Larry Coryell – guitar
 Steve Khan – guitar

References 

1977 live albums
Larry Coryell albums
Arista Records live albums
Steve Khan albums